Puti Zushi, also known as Master Bodhi, Patriarch Bodhi or Patriarch Subodhi (a Taoist Sage, is a character from the 16th century Chinese novel Journey to the West. The character is believed to be derived from Subhūti, one of the ten principal disciples of the Buddha.

Background 

Puti was a mentor and tutor of the protagonist, the Monkey King (known as Sun Wukong in Chinese), endowing him with supernatural powers through Taoist practices. These include the "seventy-two earthly transformations" (shape-shifting abilities), immortality, and cloud-somersaulting, the ability to traverse 108,000 li (used as a synonym for "indefinitely large number", although literally a distance of ~54,000 km) in one somersault. Puti foresaw the flaws in his disciple's character, most notably his ego and amorality; therefore, he would later request Sun Wukong to keep his discipleship a secret.

Sun Wukong's first meeting with Master Puti is believed to be based on the story of Huineng's Introduction to Hongren, as told in the Platform Sūtra of Zen Buddhism. Because of the role that Subhūti plays in the story, his name has remained familiar in Chinese culture.

He is described as proficient in both Taoist and Buddhists practices.

See also
Journey to the West
The Monkey King
Zhenyuan Daxian

References

Chinese deities
Chinese gods
Journey to the West characters
Shapeshifting